Duga may refer to:

 Duga (moth), a synonym of a genus of moths
 Duga radar, Soviet radar system deployed 1976-1989
 Duga (magazine), Yugoslav and Serbian weekly newsmagazine
 Shaft bow, element of horse harness to attach to vehicle shaft

Geography
 Duga Island, island in Adriatic Sea, belonging to Croatia 
 Duga Resa, municipality in Karlovac County, Croatia
 Duga, Podgorica, town in Podgorica Municipality, Montenegro 
 Duga, Nikšić, town in Nikšić Municipality, Montenegro 
 Duga, Štimlje, town in Štimlje municipality, Kosovo